Saint-Marceau is a commune in the Sarthe department in the region of Pays de la Loire in north-western France.

World War II
After the liberation of the area by Allied Forces in August 1944, engineers of the Ninth Air Force IX Engineering Command began construction of a combat Advanced Landing Ground outside of the town.  Declared operational on 31 August, the airfield was designated as "A-43". It was used by several combat units until November 1944 when the units moved to Central France and the airfield was closed.

See also
Communes of the Sarthe department

References

Communes of Sarthe